Efthimios Mitas (born 15 May 1985) is a Greek sport shooter. At the 2012 Summer Olympics, he competed in the Men's skeet, finishing in 25th place. At the 2016 Summer Olympics, he took the 13th place at the same event.

Records

References

1985 births
Living people
Greek male sport shooters
Olympic shooters of Greece
Shooters at the 2012 Summer Olympics
Shooters at the 2016 Summer Olympics
Sportspeople from Athens
Shooters at the 2015 European Games
European Games competitors for Greece
Mediterranean Games bronze medalists for Greece
Mediterranean Games medalists in shooting
Competitors at the 2013 Mediterranean Games